List of Pará rivers by confluence.

Table of rivers by confluence

See also
List of rivers of Pará

External links
Para state with Rivers v-brazil.com
Tocantins state with Rivers v-brazil.com
Mato Grosso state with Rivers v-brazil.com

Para02
Rivers02